Hexanematichthys is a genus of sea catfishes consisting of three species. Two species occur in the coastal waters in the region of South Asia to Australasia and the third, H. henni, is found in fresh waters in tropical South America.

Species
 Hexanematichthys henni Fisher & C. H. Eigenmann, 1922
 Hexanematichthys mastersi (J. D. Ogilby, 1898) (Master's catfish)
 Hexanematichthys sagor (F. Hamilton, 1822) (Sagor catfish)

References
 

Ariidae
Catfish genera
Taxa named by Pieter Bleeker